Collet is an electoral constituency in the Belize District represented in the House of Representatives of the National Assembly of Belize since 2003 by Patrick Faber of the United Democratic Party.

Profile

The Collet constituency was created for the 1961 general election as part of a major nationwide redistricting. The constituency is based in areas of Belize City west of the city center, bordered by the Lake Independence, Port Loyola, Pickstock, Albert, Mesopotamia and Queen's Square constituencies.

Although less competitive in recent years, Collet has historically been the scene of several very close elections. Between 1965 and 1993 the winner was decided with less than one percent of the vote on four occasions.

Area Representatives

Elections

References

Political divisions in Belize
Collet (Belize House constituency)
British Honduras Legislative Assembly constituencies established in 1961
1961 establishments in British Honduras